Ancient Forest/Chun T'oh Whudujut Provincial Park and Protected Area is a provincial park and protected area located in the regional district of Fraser-Fort George in British Columbia. The park was established on 19 May 2016 to protect a portion of the North American inland temperate rainforest, the only inland temperate rainforest in the world.

Description
The park contains a number of trees estimated to be over 1000 years old.

History
The park is located within the traditional territory of the Lheidli T'enneh Nation who have inhabited the area since time immemorial.

In 2018, the provincial government and Lheidli T'enneh Nation signed a memorandum of understanding to work together on the planning and management of the park.

On 6 July 2020, the Lheidli T'enneh Nation announced that both the provincial and federal government are contributing funds toward an $8.7 million development project to improve park facilities and build an interpretative centre sharing Lheidli T'enneh culture with visitors.

See also
List of provincial parks of Fraser-Fort George Regional District

References

External links

AFA gallery showcasing the recently opened Ancient Forest/Chun T'oh Whudujut Provincial Park, 2017

Fraser River
Provincial parks of British Columbia